Eduard Kõppo (also Kepp; 30 May 1894 – 6 November 1966) was an Estonian sports figure.

He was born in Paide.

In 1918 he won Estonian Figure Skating Championships in men's singles. He won championships also in bandy, relay swimming and rowing.

In 1940s he was acting chairman of Estonian Sports Association Kalev, and in 1944 its chairman.

He participated on Estonian War of Independence, belonging to military unit called Kalevlaste Maleva.

Awards:
 1929: Order of the Cross of the Eagle, V class
 1938: Order of the White Star, V class

References

1894 births
1966 deaths
Estonian male single skaters
Estonian bandy players
Estonian male swimmers
Estonian military personnel of the Estonian War of Independence
Recipients of the Order of the White Star, 5th Class
Recipients of the Military Order of the Cross of the Eagle, Class V
Sportspeople from Paide